María Elena Calle (born 25 July 1975) is an Ecuadorian marathon runner. She placed 99th at the 2016 Olympics.

Calle took up running in 1984, but ran her first marathon only in 2011. She has a degree in occupational therapy from Virginia Commonwealth University. She is married to Brad Lowery and works as a therapist in the United States.

References

External links

 

1975 births
Living people
Ecuadorian female long-distance runners
Ecuadorian female marathon runners
Place of birth missing (living people)
Athletes (track and field) at the 2016 Summer Olympics
Olympic athletes of Ecuador
21st-century Ecuadorian women